Robert O'Brien may refer to:

Robert O'Brien (artist) (born 1939), from British Hong Kong
Robert O'Brien (canoeist) (born 1933), American sprint canoer
Robert O'Brien (cricketer) (1869-1922), Australian cricketer
Robert O'Brien (executive) (1907–1997), Hollywood businessman
Robert O'Brien (racing driver) (1908–1987), American
Robert O'Brien (RAF officer) (active 1990s), former Air Secretary
Robert C. O'Brien (born 1966), US National Security Advisor
Robert C. O'Brien (author) (1918–1973), US journalist and children's book author
Bob O'Brien (born 1949), baseball player
Bob O'Brien (basketball) (1927–2008), American basketball player